AthensCon is a non-profit multi-genre entertainment and comic book convention held annually in Athens, Attica, Greece. AthensCon is the first large-scale comic book convention held in Greece. It was founded in 2015 and it is held annually in Athens for two days in the beginning of December.

History and organization 
Currently AthensCon is one of the main conventions in the Balkan Peninsula and the Eastern Mediterranean. Furthermore, during the main event, there are also held seminars, competitions, mini-championships and other activities (such as cosplay gatherings, sword fights and retro video game exhibitions) where the visitors can participate themselves. Notable guests include: Eugenios Trivizas, Adrian_Paul, John Howe, Ian Whyte, Stefan Kapicic, Chris Achilleos, Erik J. Larsen, David Hine, Ron Marz, Steve Cardenas, Clive Russel, James O'Barr, Mark Waid and Miltos Yerolemou.

See also 

 Comic book convention
 Comic Art Convention
 Fandom
 Athens
 Science fiction convention

References

2015 establishments in Greece
Annual events in Greece
Comics conventions
Conventions in Greece
Recurring events established in 2015
Multigenre conventions